Gautampura Road railway station (station code: GPX) is one of the local railway stations in Ujjain. The station used to be a metre-gauge station on Ratlam–Indore metre-gauge line.

In 2015, Ratlam–Indore metre-gauge line was converted into a broad-gauge line, hence connecting Indore and Ratlam directly.

Major trains 
The following trains stop at Gautampura Road Junction:
79312/79311 Laxmibai Nagar–Ratlam DEMU
79305/79306 Ratlam–Indore DMU

See also

References 

Railway stations in Ujjain district
Ujjain
Ratlam railway division
Railway junction stations in Madhya Pradesh
Year of establishment missing